The discography of Biohazard includes nine studio albums, two live albums, two demo albums, one compilation album, 15 singles and 13 music videos.

Studio albums

Live albums

Compilations

Demos

Singles

Featured singles

Music videos 

 "Panic Attack" (1990)
 "Punishment" (1992)
 "Shades of Grey" (1992)
 "Slam (Bionyx Remix)" Onyx feat. Biohazard (1993)
 "Judgement Night" recorded with Onyx (1993)
 "Five Blocks to the Subway" (1994)
 "How It Is" (1994)
 "Tales from the Hard Side" (1994)
 "After Forever" (Black Sabbath cover) (1995)
 "Authority" (1996)
 "A Lot to Learn" (1996)
 "Sellout" (2001)
 "Vengeance Is Mine" (2012)

References 

Discographies of American artists